Alfred Gombe-Fei (born 1 November 2001) is a Central African footballer who plays for UAE Third Division club Elite Falcons, on loan from MFK Vyškov.

Club career

MFK Vyškov
After impressing at 2021 Africa U-20 Cup of Nations Gombe-Fei joined Czech National Football League club MFK Vyškov in October 2021.

Tacoma Defiance
On 16 March 2022 Gombe-Fei was loaned to MLS Next Pro club Tacoma Defiance until 30 November 2022.

International career
Gombe-Fei represented the Central African Republic in the 2021 Africa U-20 Cup of Nations. He scored the opening goal in the team's final match of the group stage, an eventual 2–1 victory over Tunisia. 

He made his senior international debut on 30 March 2021 in a 2021 Africa Cup of Nations qualifying match against Mauritania.

Career statistics

International

References

External links
 
 
MLS NEXT PRO profile

2001 births
Living people
People from Bangui
Central African Republic footballers
Association football forwards
Central African Republic international footballers
Tacoma Defiance players
MLS Next Pro players